Black Settlement Burial Ground, is a cemetery in Willow Grove, near Saint John, New Brunswick, Canada.

It is located uphill from Saint John harbour, and has a view of nearby market and the harbour.

The cemetery was founded in 1831, and is the resting place for many American Black loyalists and Black refugees who left the US for Saint John during the War of 1812. Around the same time, the location also housed a church and a school for the Black community. A replica church was constructed in the 1980's. There are no grave markers in the cemetery.

The cemetery was refurbished in 2015. The cemetery featured in Anna Minerva Henderson's sonnet The Old Burying Ground.

References 

Cemeteries in New Brunswick
Tourist attractions in New Brunswick
African-American cemeteries
1831 establishments in New Brunswick